Prostate tumor overexpressed gene 1 protein is a protein that in humans is encoded by the PTOV1 gene.

References

Further reading